Catenulidae is a family of freshwater catenulid flatworms.

Catenulids are characterized by an ovoid brain located in the preoral region. The brain lacks a distinct division into anterior and posterior lobes, although a constriction may occur.

References 

Catenulida
Platyhelminthes families